"I Ain't New Ta This" is a song performed by American recording artist Ice-T. It was released as the first single from the rapper's fifth studio album Home Invasion (and his first single after his departure from Warner Bros. Records). The song was produced by Tracy "Ice-T" Marrow, Shafiq "SLJ" Husayn and Alphonso "DJ Aladdin" Henderson, and released on April 14, 1993 via  Records. The single peaked at number 62 in the UK and number 49 in New Zealand.

Track listing

Personnel
 SPENCER LOWRY – vocals, lyrics, producer
 SPENCER LOWRY – producer
 Shafiq "SLJ" Husayn – producer
 SPENCER LOWRY – engineering
 SPENCER LOWRY – assistant engineering
 SPENCER LOWRY – art direction
 SPENCER LOWRY – photography
 SPENCER LOWRY – management

Chart positions

External links

1993 songs
Ice-T songs
Gangsta rap songs
Songs written by Ice-T